The term regular can mean normal or in accordance with rules. It may refer to:

People
 Moses Regular (born 1971), America football player

Arts, entertainment, and media

Music
 "Regular" (Badfinger song)
 Regular tunings of stringed instruments, tunings with equal intervals between the paired notes of successive open strings

Other uses in arts, entertainment, and media
 Regular character, a main character who appears more frequently and/or prominently than a recurring character
 Regular division of the plane, a series of drawings by the Dutch artist M. C. Escher which began in 1936
 Regular Show, an animated television sitcom
 The Regular Guys, a radio morning show

Language 
 Regular inflection, the formation of derived forms such as plurals in ways that are typical for the language
 Regular verb
 Regular script, the newest of the Chinese script styles

Mathematics 
There are an extremely large number of unrelated notions of "regularity" in mathematics.

Algebra and number theory 
(See also the geometry section for notions related to algebraic geometry.)
 Regular category, a kind of category that has similarities to both Abelian categories and to the category of sets
 Regular chains in computer algebra
 Regular element (disambiguation), certain kinds of elements of an algebraic structure
 Regular extension of fields
 Regular ideal (multiple definitions)
 Regular monomorphisms and regular epimorphisms, monomorphisms (resp. epimorphisms) which equalize (resp. coequalize) some parallel pair of morphisms
 Regular numbers, numbers which evenly divide a power of 60
 Regular p-group, a concept capturing some of the more important properties of abelian p-groups, but general enough to include most "small" p-groups
 Regular prime, a prime number p > 2 that does not divide the class number of the p-th cyclotomic field
 The regular representation of a group G, the linear representation afforded by the group action of G on itself
 Regular ring, a ring such that all its localizations have Krull dimension equal to the minimal number of generators of the maximal ideal
 von Neumann regular ring, or absolutely flat ring (unrelated to the previous sense)
 Regular semi-algebraic systems in computer algebra
 Regular semigroup, related to the previous sense
 *-regular semigroup

Analysis 
 Borel regular measure
 Cauchy-regular function (or Cauchy-continuous function,) a continuous function between metric spaces which preserves Cauchy sequences
 Regular functions, functions that are analytic and single-valued (unique) in a given region
 Regular matrix (disambiguation)
 Regular measure, a measure for which every measurable set is "approximately open" and "approximately closed"
 The regular part, of a Laurent series, the series of terms with positive powers
 Regular singular points, in theory of ordinary differential equations where the growth of solutions is bounded by an algebraic function
 Regularity, the degree of differentiability of a function
 Regularity conditions arise in the study of first class constraints in Hamiltonian mechanics
 Regularity of an elliptic operator

Combinatorics, discrete math, and mathematical computer science 
 Regular algebra, or Kleene algebra
 Regular code, an algebraic code with a uniform distribution of distances between codewords
 Regular expression, a type of pattern describing a set of strings in computer science
 Regular graph, a graph such that all the degrees of the vertices are equal
 Szemerédi regularity lemma, some random behaviors in large graphs
 Regular language, a formal language recognizable by a finite state automaton (related to the regular expression)
 Regular map (graph theory), a symmetric tessellation of a closed surface
 Regular matroid, a matroid which can be represented over any field
 Regular paperfolding sequence, also known as the dragon curve sequence
 Regular tree grammar
 Regular string, a binary string in which the one-density in any long consecutive substring is close to the one-density in the whole
string

Geometry 
 Castelnuovo–Mumford regularity of a coherent sheaf
 Closed regular sets in solid modeling
 Irregularity of a surface in algebraic geometry
 Regular curves
 Regular grid, a tesselation of Euclidean space by congruent bricks
 Regular map (algebraic geometry), a map between varieties given by polynomials
 Regular point, a non-singular point of an algebraic variety
 Regular point of a differentiable map, a point at which a map is a submersion
 Regular polygons, polygons with all sides and angles equal
 Regular polyhedron, a generalization of a regular polygon to higher dimensions
Regular polytope, a generalization of a regular polygon to higher dimensions
 Regular skew polyhedron

Logic, set theory, and foundations 
 Axiom of Regularity, also called the Axiom of Foundation, an axiom of set theory asserting the non-existence of certain infinite chains of sets
 Partition regularity
 Regular cardinal, a cardinal number that is equal to its cofinality
 Regular modal logic

Probability and statistics 
 Regular conditional probability, a concept that has developed to overcome certain difficulties in formally defining conditional probabilities for continuous probability distributions
 Regular stochastic matrix, a stochastic matrix such that all the entries of some power of the matrix are positive

Topology 
 Free regular set, a subset of a topological space that is acted upon disjointly under a given group action
 Regular homotopy
 Regular isotopy in knot theory, the equivalence relation of link diagrams that is generated by using the 2nd and 3rd Reidemeister moves only
 Regular space (or ) space, a topological space in which a point and a closed set can be separated by neighborhoods

Organizations 
 Regular army for military usage 
 Regular Baptists, an 18th-century American and Canadian Baptist group
 Regular clergy,  members of a religious order subject to a rule of life
 Regular Force for usage in the Canadian Forces
 Regular Masonic jurisdictions, or regularity, refers to the constitutional mechanism by which Freemasonry Grand Lodges or Grand Orients give one another mutual recognition

Science and social science
 Regular bowel movements, the opposite of constipation
 Regular economy, an economy characterized by an excess demand function whose slope at any equilibrium price vector is non-zero
 Regular moon, a natural satellite that has low eccentricity and a relatively close and prograde orbit
 Regular solutions in chemistry, solutions that diverge from the behavior of an ideal solution only moderately

Other uses 
 Regular customer, a person who visits the same restaurant, pub, store, or transit provider frequently
 Regular (footedness) in boardsports, a stance in which the left foot leads

See also
 Irregular (disambiguation)
 Regular set (disambiguation)

References